American wild ale is a sour beer brewed in the United States using yeast or bacteria in addition to Saccharomyces cerevisiae for fermentation. Such beers are similar to Belgian Lambic and Oud bruin, and typically fermented using a strain of brettanomyces, resulting in a "funky" flavor.

See also
 List of beer styles

References

American beer styles